Joar Vaadal (born 2 August 1960) is a Norwegian football player. He was born in Steinkjer. He played for the club Lillestrøm, and also for the Norwegian national team. He competed at the 1984 Summer Olympics in Los Angeles.

References

External links
 

1960 births
Living people
People from Steinkjer
Norwegian footballers
Norway international footballers
Footballers at the 1984 Summer Olympics
Olympic footballers of Norway
Association football forwards
Lillestrøm SK players
Sportspeople from Trøndelag